Rene Ohashi is a Canadian cinematographer living in Toronto, Ontario, Canada. His career spanned more than 25 years. Ohashi has been nominated for over 30 awards, winning 16. His projects include Anne of Green Gables, The Wonder Years, To Catch a Killer, Gold Fever and Shades of Black: The Conrad Black Story.

Rene Ohashi has also shot thousands of commercials for national brands including: American Express, General Motors, New York Health Department, Nissan, CMA, H&R Block, Campbell's, Harvey's, Kraft, Maple Leaf, Michelina and Labatt. He is Director of Photography for Sesler Company.

Filmography

Awards

Canadian Society of Cinematographers Awards
2007 won the Best Cinematography in TV Series for: Kidnapped Special Delivery episode (2006)2003 won the Best Cinematography in Theatrical Feature for: They (2002)
2002 won the Best Cinematography in TV Drama for: Club Land (2001) (TV)
1997 won the Best Cinematography in TV Drama for: The Arrow (1997) (TV)
1990 won the Best Cinematography in Theatrical Feature for: Millennium (1989)
1989 won the Best Cinematography in Theatrical Feature for: Shadow Dancing (1988)

American Society of Cinematographers, USA
2001 won the Outstanding Achievement in Cinematography in Movies of the Week/Mini-Series'/Pilot for Cable or Pay TV for: The Crossing (2000) (TV)

Gemini Awards
2007 won the Best Photography in a Dramatic Program or Series for: Shades of Black: The Conrad Black Story (2006) (TV)
2004 won the Best Photography in a Dramatic Program or Series for: Shattered City: The Halifax Explosion (2003) (TV)
2001 won the Best Photography in a Comedy, Variety or Performing Arts Program or Series for: Great Performances (1972) for the episode "Don Giovanni Unmasked".
1998 won the Best Photography in a Dramatic Program or Series award for: The Arrow (1997) (TV)
1995 won the Best Photography in a Dramatic Program or Series for: Race to Freedom: The Underground Railroad (1994) (TV)
1994 won the Best Photography in a Dramatic Program or Series for: The Diviners (1993) (TV)
1993 won the Best Photography in a Dramatic Program or Series for: The Sound and the Silence (1992) (TV)
1987 won the Best Photography in a Dramatic Program or Series for: The Truth About Alex (1986) (TV)
1986 won the Best Photography in a Dramatic Program or Series'' for: Anne of Green Gables (1985) (TV)

References

External links
Bio: "Rene Ohashi", Sesler website
 

Living people
Canadian people of Japanese descent
Year of birth missing (living people)
Canadian cinematographers